The Dyer Observatory, also known as the Arthur J. Dyer Observatory, is an astronomical observatory owned and operated by Vanderbilt University.  Built in 1953, it is located in Nashville, Tennessee, and is the only university facility not located on the main campus in Nashville. The observatory is named after Arthur J. Dyer, who paid for the observatory's -wide dome, and houses a  reflecting telescope named for astronomer Carl Seyfert.  Today, the observatory primarily serves as a teaching tool; its mission is to interest the public in the fields of astronomy, science and engineering. The observatory was listed on the National Register of Historic Places on March 6, 2009.

History

Vanderbilt's first observatory was housed on the campus itself.  It was equipped with a  refracting telescope and was the site of E. E. Barnard's earliest astronomical work. Barnard would eventually discover 16 comets and the fifth moon of Jupiter, receive the only honorary degree Vanderbilt has ever awarded, and have the on-campus observatory named in his honor. However, that on-campus observatory would eventually prove insufficient for the university's needs.

When Seyfert joined the university's faculty in 1946, he lobbied for increasing the astronomy department's modest course offerings and for a new observatory. He solicited donations from over 80 Nashville businesses to outfit the new observatory and convinced Dyer, owner of Nashville Bridge Company, to donate the funds for and to install the observatory's dome. When the observatory opened in December 1953, Seyfert was named its director, and, after his death, the  telescope was named in his honor.

The dome was originally painted aluminium, but this caused problems with observations before midnight while the telescope dome cooled. It was subsequently painted white in 1963, which significantly reduced the temperature of the dome and improved observations.

See also 
List of astronomical observatories

References

External links
 Vanderbilt Dyer Observatory homepage
 Vanderbilt Dyer Observatory Clear Sky Clock Forecasts of observing conditions.

Vanderbilt University
Astronomical observatories in Tennessee
University and college buildings on the National Register of Historic Places in Tennessee
Buildings and structures in Williamson County, Tennessee
National Register of Historic Places in Williamson County, Tennessee